Saleh Adibi is an Iranian academic and diplomat currently serving as Iran's extraordinary and plenipotentiary ambassador to Vietnam and accredited non-resident ambassador to Cambodia.

Adibi is the first ethnic Kurdish and the first Sunni ambassador in Iran.

References

Living people
21st-century Iranian diplomats
Academic staff of the Islamic Azad University
University of Tehran alumni
People from Sanandaj
Iranian Kurdish politicians
Iranian Sunni Muslims
Ambassadors of Iran to Vietnam
Ambassadors of Iran to Cambodia
Year of birth missing (living people)